

Hi

References

Sources

 
 

 
 

 

 
 
 
 

 

 

 
 

 
 

Heroes in Norse myths and legends
Germanic heroic legends